Kenner released more than 100 action figures in their Star Wars range between 1977 and 1985. The table below takes information as given on the cards with which each action figure debuted. After the debut of an action figure, details in the packaging, in the shape of the action figure and the name of the action figure were subject to change. No one characteristic (name, shape or product number) completely defines the list, rather all the characteristics taken together form a clear list.

There are 96 action figures listed below, though the final card-back promoted a full line of 93 action figures. This is because when Kenner produced new versions (with new, unique product numbers) of R2-D2 and C-3PO action figures, they discontinued previous versions. Two versions of R2-D2 were discontinued. One version of C-3PO was discontinued.

The identical name "Bespin Security Guard" is given to two action figures. The first figure (No. 39810) is white, the second figure (No. 69640) is black. On card-backs the two Bespin Security Guards are shown separately, but still labeled with the same name. C-3PO (Removable Limbs) – No. 69430 / No. 69600 – was finally confirmed to exist on a U.S. release 45-Back "The Empire Strikes Back" card in 2018.

Additional action figures, consisting of a taller blue Snaggletooth, and the three members of the Rebo Band (Max Rebo, Sy Snootles and Droopy McCool), were produced for inclusion in Kenner Star Wars toy sets, but were never released on blister cards. Jabba the Hutt and several other Star Wars creatures were also produced for this line, but are not generally considered part of the action figure line-up.

The years listed in the table specify the year of production, not the year of release.

References

Bibliography

Star Wars merchandise
Action figures
1970s toys
1980s toys